Grigoriy Davydovich Plaskov, also known as G.D. Plaskov and Hirsch Plaskov, was a Lieutenant General of Artillery for the Soviet Union. He is known for being one of the most prominent Jews in the Red Army.

Early Life, Russian Civil War, and Interwar 
Plaskov was born in December of 1898 in Minsk to a Jewish family. Plaskov's father was a brewer. In 1911, he graduated from the local yeshiva and was employed as a metal worker in "Mateushik and Sons," an iron foundry.

Plaskov joined the  Red Guard in  October of 1917 and, after joining the Red Army in May of 1918, fought in the Russian Civil War for the Bolsheviks. 

In the years following the war, Plaskov attended an advanced artillery school, graduating in 1925, as well as attending the Frunze Military Academy in Moscow, graduating in 1932, and the  Military Academy of Chemical Protection, graduating in 1938.

World War II 
Plaskov saw action during World War Two, beginning in July of 1941, when he assisted Ivan Flyorov by firing one of the first Katyushas at the Wehrmacht  in Orsha. Roughly a month later, Plaskov would attempt to defend  Zhlobin alongside Leonid Petrovsky.

Plaskov then helped to defend Moscow from the German Forces and participated in the counter-offensive that repelled them from the city. In the winter of 1942, Plaskov was promoted to Major General of Artillery of the 10th Army under Lieutenant General Filipp Golikov. During his time in the army, Plaskov would frequently be reprimanded by the Soviet High Command for "indiscreet actions," but would remain a Major General of Artillery for the remainder of the war. During the Battle of Berlin, Plaskov proudly exclaimed to Lieutenant General Semyon Krivoshein:

Look, Sema, just look! Jew Grigory Plaskov beats Hitler, beats this bitch right on the head! Beat, beat him, lads! Beat for Babi Yar, for the  torment of our people! Fire, more fire, more fire! Indeed, a symbolic episode...

Postwar 
Following the war's conclusion, Plaskov was promoted to Lieutenant General of Artillery and nominated for Hero of the Soviet Union but ultimately never received the latter. Plaskov would later say that he never considered anti-Semitism to be a factor in this event. Plaskov did, however, receive the Order of the Red Banner four times, the Order of Lenin two times, the Order of Kutuzov, the Order of Bogdan Khmelnitsky, the Medal for the Defense of Moscow, the Medal for the Liberation of Warsaw, the Medal for the Capture of Berlin, and the Medal for Victory Over Germany in the Great Patriotic War of 1941-1945. Regarding Plaskov's service in the Soviet military, Marshal Zhukov said, "I don't know of any soldier more valiant than General Plaskov."

In the early 1950s, Plaskov was the Deputy Military Commander of the Taurida Military District, but this changed in 1952. "The anti-Semitic year of 1952" would see the Soviet Union orchestrate a number of actions against the Jewish people, with some being directly influenced by Joseph Stalin. Among these were the Doctors' plot, the Night of the Murdered Poets, and a number of other purges. Stalin would also give a number of speeches where he referred to Jewish people as a "potential fifth column" and said that "every Jewish nationalist is the agent of the American intelligence service." It was during this year of widespread anti-Semitism that Plaskov was demoted and appointed as the Head of the Military Department of the State University of Non-Ferrous Metals and Gold. Shortly afterward, in 1956, Plaskov would retire. 

Plaskov wrote his memoir, Under the Roar of the Cannonade, in 1969. That same year, the village council of Cosăuți in Moldova awarded Plaskov the title of "Honorary Citizen of Kosouts." Plaskov died three years later in Moscow and was buried in Vvedenskoye Cemetery.

Legacy 
In 2010, a memorial was erected in Sheremetevsky that commemorated Plaskov and eighty-one other former residents of the officer's village that contributed to the Soviet war effort in the Second World War. Among the other officers who were commemorated are Vasily Glazunov and Yuri Rykachev.

Notes

References

Bibliography
 Sverdlov, F.D., Ruvik Danieli, and Yishai Cordova. Jewish Generals in the Armed Forces of the Soviet Union. Latrun: Yad Lashiryon, 2005.
 Kazakov, V.I. At the Break. Military Publishing, 1962.
 Schulman, Elias. ‘Sovietish Heimland’: Lone Voices, Stifled Creators. Judaism 14, no. 1 (1965).
 Gitelman, Zvi. Soviet Reactions to the Holocaust, 1945–1991. Essay. In The Holocaust in the Soviet Union, 1st Edition. Routledge, 1993. 
 Colton, Timothy J.. Commissars, Commanders, and Civilian Authority: The Structure of Soviet Military Politics. Cambridge, MA and London, England: Harvard University Press, 1979.
 Pashkov, G.P., et al. Belaruskaâ èncyklapedyâ. Polycrates - Prometheus ed., vol. 11, BelEn, 2001.

External links
 https://www.infocenters.co.il/gfh/notebook_ext.asp?book=8996&lang=eng&site=gfh
 https://lechaim-journal.livejournal.com/137393.html
 https://www.rujen.ru/index.php/ПЛАСКОВ_Григорий_Давидович
 https://evreimir.com/160582/bogi-vojny/
 https://www.geni.com/people/Grigoriy-Plaskov/6000000187576262837
 https://en.wikiquote.org/wiki/Grigoriy_Plaskov

1898 births
1972 deaths
Soviet Jews in the military
Soviet Jews
Soviet military personnel
Soviet military personnel of World War II
People from Minsk
Recipients of the Order of Lenin
Jews of World War II